Chalcomima is a genus of moth in the family Gelechiidae. It contains the species Chalcomima hoplodoxa, which is found in Peru.

The wingspan is about 8 mm. The forewings are dark bronzy-fuscous with bright shining brassy-bronze or coppery-bronze markings, consisting of a basal patch confluent with an oblique wedge-shaped spot from the costa at one-fourth, a transverse-linear mark in the middle of the disc, an oval dorsal blotch beneath this, a triangular costal spot at two-thirds, and a terminal fascia which is broadest in the middle and narrowed at the extremities. The hindwings are grey.

References

Anacampsinae